Naroa Agirre Camio (born 15 May 1979 in San Sebastián) is a female pole vaulter from Spain. Her current personal best is 4.50 metres, achieved in May 2006 in Saulheim. She has 4.56 metres on the indoor track, from February 2007 in Seville. She is the national record holder for the sport.

Agirre won her fifth national title in the pole vault in Barcelona in 2009.

She also works as an actress, appearing in Basque TV show Goenkale.

Achievements

References

External links
 
 
 
 
 
  

1979 births
Living people
Spanish female pole vaulters
Athletes (track and field) at the 2004 Summer Olympics
Athletes (track and field) at the 2008 Summer Olympics
Olympic athletes of Spain
Sportspeople from San Sebastián
World Athletics Championships athletes for Spain
Mediterranean Games silver medalists for Spain
Athletes (track and field) at the 2013 Mediterranean Games
Mediterranean Games medalists in athletics
Athletes from the Basque Country (autonomous community)
Spanish television actresses
Basque-language actors